The 2023 Women's Afrobasket qualification will be played on various dates in 2023 to determine the seven teams who qualify for the 2023 Women's Afrobasket. Teams compete with other teams in their respective "zones" for a spot in the championship tournament. There are seven zones in total.

Participating teams

Zone 4
Two teams will play a two-game series to determine the qualifying team.

Overview

Games

Zone 5
Five teams played to finalize one teams who qualifies. The tournament was in Kampala, Uganda from 14 to 19 February 2023.

Preliminary round

Third place game

Final

Zone 6
Four teams played to determine the team who qualifies. The tournament was held in Bulawayo, Zimbabwe from 21 to 28 February 2023. South Africa withdrew before the tournament.

Preliminary round

Third place game

Final

Qualified teams

Statistical leaders

Player averages
As of 28 February 2023

Team averages

References

External links 
2023 FIBA Women's Afrobasket Qualifiers

qualification